The 50th edition of the World Allround Speed Skating Championships for Women took place on 4 and 5 February 1989 in Lake Placid at the James B. Sheffield Olympic Skating Rink.

The titleholder is Constanze Moser-Scandolo from East Germany.

Distance medalists

Classification

 DNS = Did not start

Source:

References

Attribution
In Dutch

1980s in speed skating
1980s in women's speed skating
1989 World Allround
1989 in women's speed skating